Kahan Singh Pannu is an IAS Officer in Punjab, India.

.He is on post of Secretary, Agriculture(Punjab).

References

Indian Administrative Service officers